Caragiale is a surname in Romania, associated with several members of a theatrical and literary family:
Ion Luca Caragiale, playwright, short story writer and journalist, a leading figure in Romanian literature
Costache and Iorgu Caragiale, theater managers and dramaturgs, Ion Luca's uncles
 Mateiu Caragiale, novelist and short story writer, Ion Luca's oldest son
 Luca Caragiale, poet, Ion Luca's youngest son.

See also 
 I. L. Caragiale, Dâmbovița, a commune in Dâmboviţa County
 I. L. Caragiale National Theatre
 Statue of Ion Luca Caragiale (Bucharest)

Romanian-language surnames